Tommy Schleh (born December 10, 1964 in Neckarbischofsheim), known under his stage name as DJ Klubbingman, is a Eurodance DJ and producer. He is a member of the group Masterboy.

Masterboy
In 1989, he and Enrico Zabler started working on dance music sounds. Their Eurodance group Masterboy was highly popular during the 1990s.

In 1999, his solo single "Welcome to the Club" was a success, along with "Living on a Better World".

Kinki Palace club
Since the age of 17, he has been working as a DJ. Today he owns the dance club Kinki Palace in Sinsheim in southwest Germany, where he still occasionally produces techno sounds himself.

As of 2009, his productions are broadcast weekly on the radio station Sunshine Live (every Tuesday from 8 to 12 pm).

Solo singles 
 "Dreaming for a Better World"
 "Welcome to the Club"
 "Open Your Mind"
 "Highway to the Sky"
 "No Limit (On the Beach)"
 "Magic Summer Night"
 "We Call It Revolution" (feat. Trixi Delgado)
 "Love Message" (feat. Trixi Delgado)
 "Ride on a White Train" (feat. Trixi Delgado)
 "Another Day, Another Night" (feat. Trixi Delgado)

References

External links 
 Official Site
 
 
 Kinki palace
 Fan shop
 Sunshine Live

German DJs
German record producers
1964 births
Living people
Eurodance musicians
Electronic dance music DJs